The Urban Sophisticates are a hip-hop group from Greensboro, North Carolina formed in 2002. The group consists of 7 members: Benton James - MC, Aaron James - Vocals, Jeremy Denman - Trumpet, Sal Mascali - Trombone, Ryan Kee - Bass, Romondo Jessup - Drums, Darion Alexander - Bass. They are notable for their use of live instruments, particularly their horn section They have described their sound as "post bling neo funk hip hop for ya soul."

History 
The group formed in 2002 in Greensboro, North Carolina. Upon their inception as a group, they began playing at local venues around Greensboro and Chapel Hill. In 2003, they released their debut, self-titled album independently. It was followed by The Coward's Anthem in 2005.

Independent Music World Series 
In 2006, they won the Southeast Disc Makers Independent Music World Series and "took home their share of $250,000 in prizes, including recording gear, instruments, CD manufacturing services, and more."

Discography 
Urban Sophisticates (2002)
The Coward's Anthem (2005)
1.Coward's Anthem
2.We Can Watch it All
3.Run
4.Chapel Hill
5.Khaos Mathematics
6.It's About Time
7.Breakups
8.I'm Feelin it
9.Fake Gun Hands
10.To the Top
11.Soul Crime
12.Testify
13.Legend
14.The Waiting Room
Live from the Pour House (2007)
Classic Material (2009)

References

External links
 Triangle Arts and Entertainment
 The Beast Music
 Yes Weekly

American hip hop groups
Musical groups from North Carolina